Liar is the third studio album by American alternative rock band The Jesus Lizard, released in 1992 by Touch and Go Records. The album is considered to be among the band's best work: according to Mark Deming of AllMusic, "Liar isn't quite the wildest or weirdest album the Jesus Lizard ever made, but it may well be the strongest, and perhaps the best." The artwork is "Allegory of Death" by painter Malcolm Bucknall, who also provided art for the album Down and the "Puss/Oh, the Guilt" split single with Nirvana.

Liar was ranked as the 58th best album of the 1990s by the online music magazine Pitchfork.

Track listing

References

External links
Touch and Go Records page on the album

1992 albums
The Jesus Lizard albums
Albums produced by Steve Albini
Touch and Go Records albums